Rotten apple may refer to:

Apples that are no longer safe to eat
Rotten Apple (album), a 2006 album from Lloyd Banks
Rotten Apples, a 2001 greatest hits compilation album from The Smashing Pumpkins 
"Rotten Apple," a song by Alice in Chains from the EP Jar of Flies
The Rotten Apple, an alternative title for the 1963 film Five Minutes to Love
The nickname of Sharon Vineyard, a fictional character in Case Closed